Eriodictyon californicum is a species of plant within the family Boraginaceae. It is also known as yerba santa (sacred herb), mountain balm, bear's weed, gum bush, gum plant, and consumptive weed. Less common names include Herbe des Montagnes, Herbe à Ourse, Herbe Sacrée, Herbe Sainte, Hierba Santa, Holy Herb, and Tarweed.

Distribution
It is native to California and Oregon, where it grows in several types of habitats, including chaparral and coast redwood forests.

Description
Eriodictyon californicum is an evergreen aromatic shrub with woody rhizomes, typically found in clonal stands growing to a height of 3 to 4 feet (1+ meter). The dark green, leathery leaves are narrow, oblong to lanceolate, and up to 15 centimeters in length. Foliage and twigs are covered with shiny resin and are often dusted with black fungi, Heterosporium californicum.

It is similar to its Southern California sibling E. crassofolium.

The shrub is known to be an occasional source of nutrition for wildlife and livestock.  Their bitterness makes them unpalatable to most animals, although it does have multiple insect herbivores, including butterflies. The inflorescence is a cluster of bell-shaped white to purplish flowers, each between one and two centimeters in length.

Taxonomy
When first described, it was placed in genus Wigandia, so its basionym is Wigandia californica.

Traditional medicine
The leaves have historically been used to treat asthma, upper respiratory infections and allergic rhinitis.  The Concow tribe calls the plant wä-sä-got’-ō (Konkow language) The Chumash used it as a poultice for wounds, insect bites, broken bones, and sores. It was also used in a steam bath to treat hemorrhoids.

Medical research

The flavonoid sterubin is the main active component of Yerba santa and is neuroprotective against multiple toxicities of the aging brain, including possibly Alzheimer's disease.

Food use
Eriodictyol is one of the 4 flavanones identified in this plant by the Symrise Corporation as having taste-modifying properties, the other three being: homoeriodictyol, its sodium salt and sterubin. These compounds have potential uses in food and pharmaceutical industry to mask bitter taste.

Environmental use
This species of shrub is used for revegetating damaged or disturbed lands, such as overgrazed rangeland. It is strongly fire-adapted, sprouting from rhizomes after wildfire and developing a waxy film of flammable resins on its foliage.

Butterflies
E. californicum is a specific food and habitat plant for the  butterfly Papilio eurymedon.  It is the primary nectar source for variable checkerspot butterflies in the Jasper Ridge Biological Preserve in California.

References

External links

 Jepson Manual Treatment: Eriodictyon californicum
 USDA Plants Profile: Eriodictyon californicum
 Eriodictyon californicum Photo gallery

californicum
Flora of California
Flora of Oregon
Flora of the Cascade Range
Flora of the Klamath Mountains
Flora of the Sierra Nevada (United States)
Natural history of the California chaparral and woodlands
Natural history of the California Coast Ranges
Natural history of the Central Valley (California)
Natural history of the San Francisco Bay Area
Plants described in 1839
Butterfly food plants